Gregory D. Scholes  is William S. Tod Professor of Chemistry at Princeton University.

Career and research
Scholes research interests are in photosynthesis and quantum biology.

Awards and honours
He was elected a Fellow of the Royal Society (FRS) in 2019 for "substantial contributions to the improvement of natural knowledge".

References

Fellows of the Royal Society
Fellows of the Royal Society of Canada
University of Melbourne alumni
Living people
Year of birth missing (living people)